Park La Brea (Spanish: La Brea—"The tar", after the nearby La Brea Tar Pits) is a sprawling apartment community in the Miracle Mile District of Los Angeles, California. With 4,255 units located in eighteen 13-story towers and thirty-one two-story "garden apartment buildings", it is the largest housing development in the U.S. west of the Mississippi River.

Geography and transportation
Park La Brea is bounded by 3rd Street on the north, Cochran Avenue on the east, 6th Street on the south, and Fairfax Avenue on the west. The complex is notable for its octagonal street layout, with many internal thoroughfares at a 45° angle of displacement relative to the surrounding city street grid.

The neighborhood
After the arrival of the Spanish in the 1780s, most of the area that is now Park La Brea became part of the Rancho La Brea land grant, and remained largely devoted to agriculture and petroleum production well into the 20th century. The growth of Hollywood and the Miracle Mile made the adjacent areas desirable centers for residential development in the 1920s, but the mid-rise apartment towers that give the district its current name were built later, between 1944 and 1948.

Park La Brea represents something of a historical anomaly, having been built at a time when most visions of Los Angeles' development were dominated by low-rise tracts of single-family houses along freeway corridors.  As the towers are relatively isolated from the rest of the Miracle Mile — set far back from major thoroughfares in a nod to Le Corbusier, they developed a reputation as "the projects", since they are reminiscent of such notorious housing developments as Chicago's Robert Taylor Homes and New York's Queensbridge.  The street layout was created in a masonic pattern as a reference to the Masonic heritage of the Metropolitan Life Insurance Company, which built the complex toward the end of World War II and immediately thereafter.

Metropolitan Life Insurance also constructed a sister complex, Parkmerced in San Francisco, which features a similar street layout as Park La Brea. At the same time, they built Stuyvesant Town and Peter Cooper Village in Manhattan, Parkchester in The Bronx, and Parkfairfax in Alexandria, Virginia just outside Washington, D.C.

Design

The Park La Brea townhouses were designed by Leonard Schultze & Associates (New York) with associate architect Earl T. Heitschmidt in 1941.  The style of the architecture has been described as Modern Colonial.  The Park La Brea Towers were designed by Leonard Schultz Associates with consulting architects Stanton + Kaufmann in 1948. Inspired by the innovative housing of Le Corbusier in Paris, this architectural team set out to create innovative multifamily housing.  Their plans included square-block sized formations of town houses surrounding shared common green space.  The combined shared lawn spaces creates both a large courtyard and tree-dappled open space.

The Landmark Towers, in a revolutionary "X" structure with a unique placement, became icons of the Los Angeles skyline. The ingeniously designed plan ensured that every unit would enjoy expansive views.

History and revitalization

In the 2000s, Park La Brea had become a desirable rental community with its own community center, health club and pool, beauty parlor, and drycleaner in addition to its convenient proximity to local museums, Farmers Market (Los Angeles), and The Grove at Farmers Market shopping complex. In recent years, additional improvements have been made, such as adding new pools.

The complex completed another $8 million renovation in 2010.

Education
Residents are zoned to schools in the Los Angeles Unified School District.

Three different elementary schools serve portions of this neighborhood:
 Carthay Center Elementary School
 Hancock Park Elementary School
 Wilshire Crest Elementary School

All of the neighborhood is zoned to John Burroughs Middle School and Fairfax High School.

See also

 Co-op City
 Cooperative Village
 Mitchell Lama
 Parkchester, Bronx
 Parkfairfax, Virginia
 Parkmerced, San Francisco
 Penn South
 Riverton Houses
 Rochdale Village, Queens
 Stuyvesant Town–Peter Cooper Village

References

External links
 Official Park La Brea website
 Apartmentratings.com: Park La Brea rating
 Yelp.com: Park La Brea ratings

Neighborhoods in Los Angeles
Mid-Wilshire, Los Angeles
Apartment buildings in Los Angeles
Planned communities in California
Central Los Angeles
Westside (Los Angeles County)